Crede is an unincorporated community along U.S. Route 119 in Kanawha County, West Virginia, United States, located between Elk Hills and Big Chimney. Crede is mostly residential, but there are many small places of business. It is not listed on most maps, but is on some atlases.

References 

Unincorporated communities in Kanawha County, West Virginia
Unincorporated communities in West Virginia
Charleston, West Virginia metropolitan area